The chestnut-crowned laughingthrush (Trochalopteron erythrocephalum) is a species of bird in the family Leiothrichidae. It is found in Bhutan, China, India, and Nepal.

The silver-eared laughingthrush, formerly included as a subspecies, is now usually regarded as a separate species.

References

External links
Images at ADW

chestnut-crowned laughingthrush
Birds of North India
Birds of Nepal
Birds of Eastern Himalaya
chestnut-crowned laughingthrush
Taxonomy articles created by Polbot